The Battle of Polygon Wood took place from 26 September to 3 October 1917, during the second phase of the Third Battle of Ypres in the First World War. The battle was fought near Ypres in Belgium, in the area from the Menin road to Polygon Wood and thence north, to the area beyond St Julien. Much of the woodland had been destroyed by the huge quantity of shellfire from both sides since 16 July and the area had changed hands several times.

General Herbert Plumer continued the series of British general attacks with limited objectives. The attacks were led by lines of skirmishers, followed by small infantry columns organised in depth (a formation which had been adopted by the Fifth Army in August) with a vastly increased amount of artillery support, the infantry advancing behind five layers of creeping barrage on the Second Army front.

The advance was planned to cover  and stop on reverse slopes, which were easier to defend, enclosing ground which gave observation of German reinforcement routes and counter-attack assembly areas. Preparations were then made swiftly to defeat German counter-attacks, by mopping-up and consolidating the captured ground with defences in depth.

The drier weather continued to benefit the British attackers by solidifying the ground and raising mist which obscured British infantry attacks made around dawn. The mist cleared during the morning and revealed German  (counter-attack) formations to air and ground observation, well in advance of their arrival on the battlefield. German methodical counter-attacks from 27 September – 3 October failed and German defensive arrangements were changed hastily after the battle to try to counter British offensive superiority.

Background

Tactical developments

The preliminary operation to capture Messines ridge  had been followed by a strategic pause as the British repaired their communications behind Messines ridge, completed the building of the infrastructure necessary for a much larger force in the Ypres area and moved troops and equipment north from the Arras front. After delays caused by local conditions, the Battles of Ypres had begun on 31 July with the Battle of Pilckem Ridge, which was a substantial local success for the British, taking a large amount of ground and inflicting many casualties on the German defenders. The Germans had recovered some of the lost ground in the middle of the attack front and restricted the British advance on the Gheluvelt Plateau further south. British attacks had then been seriously hampered by unseasonal heavy rain during August and had not been able to retain much of the additional ground captured on the plateau on 10, 16–18, 22–24 and 27 August due to the determined German defence, mud and poor visibility.

Haig ordered artillery to be transferred from the southern flank of the Second Army and more artillery to be brought into Flanders from the armies further south, to increase the weight of the attack on the Gheluvelt Plateau. The principal role was changed from the Fifth to the Second Army and the boundary between the two armies was moved north towards the Ypres–Roulers railway, to narrow the frontages of the Second Army divisions on the Gheluvelt Plateau. A pause in British attacks was used to reorganise and to improve supply routes behind the front line, to carry forward  of ammunition above normal expenditure. Guns were moved forward to new positions and the infantry and artillery reinforcements practised for the next attack. The unseasonal rains stopped, the ground began to dry and the cessation of British attacks misled the Germans, who risked moving some units away from Flanders. The offensive had resumed on 20 September with the Battle of the Menin Road Ridge, using similar step-by-step methods to those of the Fifth Army after 31 July, with a further evolution of technique, based on the greater mass of artillery made available to enable the consolidation of captured ground with sufficient strength and organisation to defeat German counter-attacks. Most of the British objectives had been captured and held, with substantial losses being inflicted on the six German ground-holding divisions and their three supporting  divisions. British preparations for the next step began immediately and both sides studied the effect of the battle and the implications it had for their dispositions.

Prelude

British preparations

The Second Army altered its corps frontages soon after the attack of 20 September so that each attacking division could be concentrated on a  front. Roads and light railways were built behind the new front line to move artillery and ammunition forward, beginning on 20 September; in fine weather this was finished in four days. As before Menin road, bombardment and counter-battery fire began immediately, with practice barrages fired daily as a minimum. Artillery from the VIII Corps (Lieutenant-General Sir Aylmer Hunter-Weston) and IX Corps (Lieutenant General Alexander Hamilton-Gordon) in the south conducted bombardments to simulate attack preparations on Zandvoorde and Warneton. Haig intended that later operations would capture the rest of the ridge from Broodseinde, giving the Fifth Army scope to advance beyond the ridge north-eastwards and allow the commencement of Operation Hush.

The huge amounts of shellfire from both sides had cut up the ground and destroyed roads. New road circuits were built to carry supplies forward, especially artillery ammunition. Heavier equipment bogged in churned mud so had to be brought forward by wagons along roads and tracks, many of which were under German artillery observation from Passchendaele ridge, rather than being moved cross-country. The I Anzac Corps had  guns, one for every  of front and many field artillery brigades with 18-pounder guns and 4.5-inch howitzers, which with the guns of the other attacking corps, were moved forward  from  Assembled forward of the artillery were heavy Vickers machine-guns of the divisional machine-gun companies,  the creeping machine-gun barrage and  guns for emergency barrages against German counter-attacks and to increase the barrage towards the final objective.

The 39th Division took over from the 41st Division, ready to attack Tower Hamlets (at the top of the Bassevillebeek spur), the 33rd Division replaced the 23rd Division beyond the Menin road and the 5th and 4th Australian divisions replaced the 1st and 2nd Australian divisions in Polygon Wood. The Action of 25 September 1917 took place between the Menin road and Polygon Wood as the 33rd Division was taking over from the 23rd Division; for a time the German attack threatened to delay preparations for the British attack due the next day. Some ground was captured by the Germans and part of it was then recaptured by the 33rd Division. Plumer ordered that the flank guard protecting the I Anzac Corps on 26 September be formed by the 98th Brigade of the 33rd Division while the 100th Brigade recaptured the lost ground.

Plan

Dispersed and camouflaged German defences, using shell-hole positions, pillboxes, with much of the German infantry held back for counter-attacks, meant that as British units advanced and became weaker and disorganised by losses, fatigue, poor visibility and the channelling effect of waterlogged ground, they met more and fresher German defenders. The German defensive system had been more effective in the unusually rainy weather in August, making movement much more difficult and forcing the British to keep to duckboard tracks, easy to identify and bombard. Objectives were chosen to provide the British infantry with good positions from which to face German counter-attacks, rather than to advance with unlimited objectives. The Fifth Army had set objectives much closer than  after 31 July and the Second Army methods of September were based on SS 144 The Normal Formation for the Attack (February 1917), reflecting the experience of the fighting in August and to exploit opportunities made possible by the reinforcement of the Flanders front with another  before 20 September.

The methods based on the Second Army Note of 31 August had proved themselves on 20 September and were to be repeated. The extra infantry made available, by increasing the number of divisions and narrowing attack frontages, had greater depth than the August attacks. The leading waves of infantry were lightly equipped, further apart and followed by files or small groups ready to swarm around German defences uncovered by the skirmish lines. Each unit kept a sub-unit in close reserve, brigades a reserve battalion, battalions a reserve company and companies a reserve platoon. Where one or two objectives were to be captured, the first wave should advance to the final objective, with troops in following waves to mop-up and occupy the captured ground. Where more objectives were set, the first wave was to stop at the first objective, mop-up and dig in, ready to receive German counter-attacks, as following waves leapfrogged beyond them to the further objectives and did the same, particularly when enough artillery was present to provide covering fire for all of the depth of the attack.

The leap-frog method was chosen for the September attacks, whereas in July and August both methods had been used. Intermediate objectives closer to the front line were selected and the number of infantry attacking the first objective was reduced, since the German garrisons in the forward defended areas were small and widely dispersed. A greater number of units leapfrogged through to the next objective and the distance to the final objective was further reduced, to match the increasing density of German defences; the creeping barrage slowed as it moved towards the final objective. Particular units were allotted to mop-up and occupy areas behind the most advanced troops, to make certain that pockets of Germans overrun by the foremost troops were killed or captured, before they could emerge from shelter and re-join the battle. Increased emphasis was placed on Lewis-guns, rifle-fire and rifle-grenades. Hand-grenades were given less emphasis in favour of more rifle training. The proportion of smoke ammunition for rifle grenades and Stokes mortars was increased, to blind the occupants of German pillboxes as they were being surrounded. All units were required to plan an active defence against counter-attack, using the repulse of German infantry as an opportunity to follow up and inflict more casualties.

X Corps was to advance to create a defensive flank on the right, attacking with the 33rd and 39th divisions either side of the Menin road. The main attack was to be conducted by the I Anzac Corps with the 5th and 4th Australian divisions on the remainder of Polygon Wood and the southern part of Zonnebeke village. To the north, V Corps of the Fifth Army with the 3rd and 59th (2nd North Midland) divisions was to reach a line from Zonnebeke to Hill 40 and Kansas Farm crossroads, using the smoke and high explosive barrage (rather than shrapnel) demonstrated by the 9th (Scottish) Division on 20 September. A brigade of the 58th (2/1st London) Division, (XVIII Corps) was to attack up Gravenstafel spur towards Aviatik Farm. The relief of V Corps by II Anzac Corps, to bring the ridge as far north as Passchendaele into the Second Army area was postponed because the 1st and 2nd Australian divisions were still battle-worthy.

German preparations

Tower Hamlets spur overlooked the ground south towards Zandvoorde. The upper valleys of the Reutelbeek and Polygonebeek further north offered a commanding view of the German counter-attack assembly areas in the low ground north of the Menin road. The Butte gave observation of the east end of the Gheluvelt Plateau towards Becelaere and Broodseinde. Between the German positions lay the Belgian villages of Zonnebeke and Passchendaele.

The German defences had been arranged in a forward zone, main battle zone and rearward battle zone and after the defeat of 20 September, the 4th Army tried to adapt its defensive methods to the British tactics. At a conference on 22 September, the German commanders decided to increase the artillery effort between battles, half for counter-battery fire and half against British infantry. The accuracy of German artillery fire was to be improved by increasing the amount of artillery observation available to direct fire during British attacks. Infantry raiding was to be stepped up and counter-attacks to be made more quickly. Each of the three ground-holding divisions on the Gheluvelt Plateau had an  division in support, double the ratio on 20 September.

Action of 25 September 1917

On 25 September, a German attack on the front of the 20th (Light) Division (XIV Corps) was prevented by artillery fire but on the X Corps front, south of I Anzac Corps, a bigger German attack took place. Crown Prince Rupprecht had ordered the attack to recover ground on the Gheluvelt Plateau and to try to gain time for reinforcements to be brought into the battle zone. Return-fire from the 33rd Division troops under attack and the 15th Australian Brigade along the southern edge of Polygon wood, forced the Germans under cover after they had recaptured several pillboxes near Black Watch Corner.

Battle

26 September

Second Army

In X Corps, the 19th (Western) Division of IX Corps provided flanking artillery fire, machine-gun fire and a smoke screen for the 39th Division, keeping a very thinly occupied front line, which received much German retaliatory artillery fire at first, which fell on unoccupied ground, then diminished and became inaccurate during the day. The "Quadrilateral" further down Bassevillebeek spur, which commanding the area around Tower Hamlets was captured; the right brigade had been caught in the boggy ground of the Bassevillebeek and its two tanks in support got stuck near Dumbarton Lakes. Soon after arriving in the "Quadrilateral" it was counter-attacked by part of the German 25th Division and pushed back . The left brigade passed through Tower Hamlets to reach the final objective and consolidated behind Tower Trench, with an advanced post in the north-west of Gheluvelt Wood.

The right brigade of the 33rd Division advanced to recapture the ground lost in the German attack the day before and was stopped  short of its objective, until a reserve company assisted and gained touch with the left brigade of the 39th Division to the south. The 98th Brigade on the left attacked with reinforcements from the reserve brigade at  so as to advance  with the troops at Black Watch Corner in action the previous day. At  the brigade had gained Jerk House and met the 5th Australian Division to the north. A German barrage forced a delay until  but the German bombardment increased in intensity and the advance lost the barrage, reaching only as far as Black Watch Corner. A reserve battalion was sent through the 5th Australian Division sector, to attack to the south-east at noon, which enabled the brigade to regain most of the ground lost the day before, although well short of the day's objectives.

I Anzac Corps attacked with the 5th Australian Division on the right. In the 15th Australian Brigade the battalions were to advance successively but bunched up near the first objective and were stopped by pillboxes at the "racecourse" and fire from the 33rd Division area to the south. At some pillboxes there was resistance but many German soldiers surrendered when they were rapidly surrounded. The Butte was rushed and was found to be full of German dugouts. A reserve battalion overran the dugouts and more pillboxes nearby, advancing to just beyond the final objective, at the junction with the 4th Australian Division to the north, taking  and  An attempted German counter-attack by part of the 17th Division was dispersed by artillery and machine-gun fire.

The right brigade attacked through a mist, took the first objective with only short delays to capture pillboxes but then mistakenly advanced into the standing barrage, which had paused for twice as long as usual, to assist the 3rd Division advance through muddier conditions to the north and had to be brought back until the barrage moved forward. The northern brigade advanced to the final objective against minor opposition, moving beyond the objective to join with the 3rd Division to the north, which had pressed on into Zonnebeke.

Fifth Army

The 3rd Division attacked either side of the line at  The right brigade met little resistance but was briefly held up when crossing the Steenbeek. The advance slowed under machine-gun fire from Zonnebeke station on the far side of the railway as troops entered Zonnebeke. A German counter-attack began at  but was stopped easily.

The 59th (2nd North Midland) Division attacked with two brigades, the right brigade advancing until held up by its own barrage, to take Dochy Farm at  One battalion found a German barrage laid behind the British creeping barrage, creeping back with it, causing many casualties. The advance continued beyond the final objective to Riverside and Otto farms but when the protective barrage fell short, Riverside was abandoned. The left brigade advanced and took Schuler Farm, Cross Cottages, Kansas, Martha, Green and Road Houses then Kansas Cross and Focker pillboxes. As the brigade reached the final objective, Riverside, Toronto and Deuce Houses were captured.

In the XVIII Corps area, the 58th (2/1st London) Division attacked with one brigade at  In a thick mist some of the British troops lost direction and were then held up by fire from Dom Trench and a pillbox but after these were captured, the advance resumed until stopped at Dear House, Aviatik Farm and Vale House, about  short of the final objective. A German counter-attack pushed the British back from Aviatik Farm and Dale House and an attempt to regain them failed. Another attack at  reached Nile on the divisional boundary with the 3rd Division. German troops trickling forward to Riverside and Otto pillboxes were stopped by artillery and machine-gun fire.

Air operations

Aircraft of the Australian Flying Corps (AFC) flew over the infantry on contact patrol, the aeroplanes being distinguished by black streamers on the rear edge of their left wings. The crews called for signals from the ground by sounding a klaxon horn or dropping lights, to which infantry responded with red flares to communicate their position to be reported to the Australian divisional headquarters. The Royal Flying Corps (RFC) began operations on the night of  when 100 and 101 squadrons attacked German billets and railway stations. Mist rose before dawn and ended night flying early; low cloud was present at  when the infantry advanced, which made observation difficult. Contact-patrol and artillery-observers could see the ground and reported  artillery batteries to British artillery. Fighters flying at about  attacked German infantry and artillery; German aircraft tried the same tactic against British troops with some success, although five were shot down by ground fire. Six German aircraft were shot down by RFC and Royal Naval Air Service (RNAS) pilots over the battlefield. Operations further afield were reduced due to the low cloud but three German airfields were attacked and an offensive patrol over the front line intercepted German bombers and escorts and drove them off.

German 4th Army
Despite difficulties at the extremities of the attack front, by mid-morning most British objectives had been gained and consolidated. The Germans launched several counter-attacks, with the  divisions supported by the equivalent of ten normal divisional artilleries. Clearing weather assisted early observation of the German counter-attacks, most of which were repulsed by accurate, heavy, medium and field artillery and small-arms fire, causing many German casualties. The order reached the troops south of the Ypres–Roulers railway quickly, who attacked immediately.

Closer to the railway, troops reached the lake near Zonnebeke church and were pinned down by a British machine-gun already dug-in nearby. The order to counter-attack was slow to arrive north of the railway and did not begin until I Battalion (in reserve) arrived. The battalion was able to descend the slope from Broodseinde covered by mist and smoke, which led to few losses but some units losing direction. The British barrage near the village caused many casualties but the survivors pressed on through it and at  reached the remnants of the 3rd Battalion near the level crossing north of the village, just in time to hold off a renewed British attack  short of their position, as stray German troops trickled in.

Around noon, British aircraft on counter-attack patrol began to send wireless messages warning of German infantry advancing towards the front that had been attacked. Similar reports from the ground began in the early afternoon. In the centre German infantry from the 236th Division, 234th Division and 4th Bavarian Division were advancing north of Becelaere–Broodseinde–Passchendaele Ridge, while the 17th Division advanced south of Polygon wood. British artillery immediately bombarded these areas, disrupting the German deployment and causing the German attacks to be disjointed. A German officer later wrote of severe delays and disorganisation caused to German  units by British artillery-fire and air attacks. A German attack then developed near Polderhoek, whose survivors managed to reach the British infantry and were seen off in bayonet fighting. Observation aircraft found German troops massing against Tower Hamlets, on the Bassevillebeek spur and artillery and machine-gun barrages stopped the attack before it reached the British infantry.

At  the Germans managed to organise an attack from Tower Hamlets to north of Polygon Wood; such German infantry as got through the barrages were "annihilated" by the British infantry. German counter-attacks were only able to reach the new front line and reinforce the remnants of the front divisions. German field artillery with the infantry was hit by artillery-fire, which blocked the roads, causing delays and disorganisation. German infantry had many casualties, as they advanced down the slope in good visibility. The 236th Division lost so many men that it was only able to reinforce the troops of the 3rd Reserve Division, found east of the Zonnebeke–Haus Kathé road on Grote Molen spur, chasing a few Australian souvenir hunters out of Molenaarelsthoek.

The  units took up to two hours to cover one kilometre through the British barrages and arrived exhausted. The 17th Division had replaced the 16th Bavarian Division as the  division covering Zandvoorde, just before the battle. At  parts of the division advanced north-west towards Terhand and met the first layer of the British barrage, delaying the arrival of advanced units at their assembly areas until  Orders to advance took until  to arrive and the troops moved through crater fields and the British bombardment, dispersing to avoid swamps and the worst of the British artillery fire. Polderhoek was reached at  but the troops were sky-lined near Polderhoek Château and hit by artillery and machine-gun fire from three sides; the counter-attack "withered away".

27–29 September
On 27 September in the X Corps area on the right flank, south of the Menin road, the 39th Division stopped three German counter-attacks against Tower Hamlets Spur with artillery-fire and on the night of 27/28 September, the division was relieved by the 37th Division. In the 33rd Division area, after a report that Cameron House had been captured by the Australians, a battalion of the 98th Brigade to the north, attacked towards the 5th Australian Division against determined German resistance, reaching the Australians at Cameron Covert at  That night, the 33rd Division was relieved by the 23rd Division, which had received only two days' rest. On the morning of 27 September, the 76th Brigade and the 8th Brigade of the 3rd Division, east of Zonnebeke in the V Corps area, received orders to push on to the blue line atop Hill 40 but the attack failed. The 3rd Division repulsed a determined German attack with artillery, machine-gun and rifle-fire after severe fighting, particularly around Bostin Farm but the division, including the 9th Brigade, suffered many casualties to the German artillery and the attack due on 28 September was called off, since the reverse slope position on the west side of Hill 40 was more sheltered than the blue line along the top of the hill and was a suitable jumping-off line for the next attack. The Germans counter-attacked at least seven counter-attacks on 27 September and another seven times the next day.

Aftermath

Analysis

Each of the three German ground-holding divisions attacked on 26 September had an  division in support, which was twice the ratio of 20 September. No ground captured by the British had been regained and the counter-attacks had managed only to reach ground held by the remnants of the front-line divisions. The German official historians recorded that the German counter-attacks found well-dug-in infantry and in places, more British attacks.

The British infantry had advanced over the "field of corpses" with few casualties and dug in. German counter-attacks had advanced through the British artillery-fire only to meet massed machine-gun fire and "collapse[d] in ruins". Thaer wrote that reinforcing the front line would only present more men to be annihilated but the practice of keeping them back for counter-attacks had been thwarted. Only masses of tanks could help but the German army had none; Loßberg did not know what to do and Ludendorff had no panacea either. For the first time, the number of divisions in the 4th Army was increased but ammunition consumption was unsustainable; even on quiet days, the 4th Army fired more shells than daily receipts of the army group and on days like 20 September, consumption doubled. On 28 September, Hindenburg decided to revert to holding the front line in more strength to resist an attack and to conduct  after the British attack, rather than persist with futile and costly ; Loßberg issued new orders to the 4th Army on 30 September.

Second Army Intelligence estimated that ten divisional artilleries had supported the German troops defending the Gheluvelt Plateau, doubling the Royal Artillery casualties compared to the previous week. Major-General Charles "Tim" Harington, the Second Army chief of staff, warned in a memorandum that the maximum effort made by the 4th Army to hold ground between the Menin road and Zonnebeke, demonstrated the vital importance of the ground to the German defence. The effort made by the Germans to hold the ground captured on 25 September at the Reutelbeek and south of Polygon Wood showed the importance of the upper ends of the valley between Becelaere and Gheluvelt. The 3rd Reserve Division had experienced desertions and refusals of orders, the 50th Reserve Division was also thought to have suffered such casualties that the divisions would be relieved and that two divisions involved in the counter-attacks of 25 September had also suffered severely. The Germans could be expected to defend the Zandvoorde Ridge north of Becelaere with even greater determination to prevent the British from gaining observation over the assembly areas beyond it to the east.

Casualties

The British had   being killed. In the Second army, the 39th Division suffered  on 26 September, the 33rd Division   killed, the 4th Australian Division suffered  ( to Charles Bean, the Australian official historian, in 1941) the 5th Australian Division had   ( and wounded from  according to Bean). In the Fifth Army, the 3rd Division had   the 59th Division  and the 58th Division  of whom  killed. From 20 to 27 September, the 236th Division suffered , the 234th Division had  the 10th Ersatz Division  the 50th Reserve Division  and the 23rd Reserve Division  The 3rd Reserve Division, 17th Division, 19th Reserve Division and 4th Bavarian Division casualties are unknown;  suffered  casualties in September.

Subsequent operations

A lull followed until 30 September, when a morning attack by regiments of the fresh 8th and 45th Reserve divisions and the 4th Army , with flame-throwers and a smoke screen, on the 23rd Division (X Corps) front, north of the Menin road was defeated. A renewed attack at  also failed and when preparations for a third attack were seen at Cameron Covert and Joist Trench, an artillery bombardment stopped all activity. Joist Farm was lost by the 21st Division during a German attack on Polygon Wood and Black Watch Corner and the line stabilised east of Cameron House. German attacks near the Menin road on the 37th Division front in IX Corps and the 5th Division (X Corps) on 3 October failed. On 30 September the Germans had conducted three counter-attacks, followed by five more on 1 October and another two on 3 October.

Commemoration

Though smaller than in 1917, Polygon Wood is still a large feature; the remains of three German pillboxes captured by the Australians lie deep among the trees but few trench lines remain. The Butte is still prominent and mounted on top of it is the 5th Australian Division memorial. There are two Commonwealth War Graves Commission (CWGC) cemeteries in the vicinity of Polygon Wood, the CWGC Polygon Wood Cemetery and the CWGC Buttes New British Cemetery.  Within Buttes New British Cemetery is the CWGC New Zealand Memorial to the Missing.

Notes

Footnotes

References

Books
 
 
 
 
 
 
 
  
 
 
 
 
 
 
 
 
 
 
 
 
 
 
 
 
 
 
 

Journals
 

Theses

Further reading
 
  Translation of Meine Tätigkeit im Weltkriege 1914–1918, Berlin, Mittler und Sohn 1939

External links

 Order of Battle – France and Flanders 1917, Battle # 98 – Order of Battle for the Battle of Polygon Wood
 Historical facts on WWI in the Ypres region: Australian Embassy and Mission to the European Communities
 Sketch of the German Butte de Polygon defences
 Battle of Polygon Wood, 26 September 1917
 Battle of Polygon Wood
 YouTube video of Polygon Wood

Conflicts in 1917
1917 in Belgium
Battles of the Western Front (World War I)
Battles of World War I involving the United Kingdom
Battles of World War I involving Germany
Battles of World War I involving Australia
Battle honours of the Rifle Brigade
Battle honours of the King's Royal Rifle Corps
September 1917 events